François Joseph Fournier (December 6, 1857 - January 13, 1935) was a self-taught Belgian adventurer and entrepreneur  who explored Mexico and the island of Porquerolles. He was born into a family of modest means, in Clabecq, Belgium and died on Porquerolles.

Fournier purchased the entire island of Porquerolles in 1912, apparently as a wedding present for his wife. He planted 200 hectares (about 500 acres) of vineyards which produced a wine that was among the first to be classed des Côtes de Provence.

References

External links

1857 births
1935 deaths
Belgian businesspeople
Belgian explorers
People from Tubize
Walloon people